Sherie is a given name. Notable people with the name include:

 Sherie Rene Scott (born 1967), American actress, singer, writer, and producer
 Sherie Merlis (born 1972), Malaysian actress

See also
 Sheree
 Sheri
 Sherry (name)